The Avro 684 was a proposed British high altitude heavy bomber of the Second World War, based on Avro's successful Lancaster.

Design
Due to the increasing vulnerability of contemporary heavy bombers, the need to fly at ever higher altitudes to avoid Anti-aircraft fire and fighter interception became paramount. Avro developed the Lancaster to fulfil the requirement for such a high altitude bomber completing a brochure in August 1941, for the Avro 684 Stratosphere Bomber. Chadwick decided to design a bomber that would dispense with defensive armament and rely on altitude and speed to evade enemy defences and was essentially a Lancaster with the nose section containing a pressure cabin (similar to the cabin from the Vickers Wellington B Mark X) and a large 'chin' mounted air intake and heat exchanger assembly.

To achieve this performance, Chadwick used an engine arrangement called the 'Master-Slave' layout. The four wing-mounted Rolls-Royce Merlin XX engines driving four-bladed  diameter Rotol propellers, were to be supercharged by a fuselage-mounted slave Rolls-Royce Merlin 45 engine driving a large supercharger supplying pressurised air via an intercooler.

Due to the pressure of constant developments to the Lancaster and design work on the York, the 684 was abandoned.

Specifications (projected)

References

Bibliography

 Butler, Tony. British Secret Projects. Fighters & Bombers 1935 - 1950. Hickney, England: Midland Publishing. 2004 .
 Holmes, Harry. Avro Lancaster. The Definitive Record 2nd Edition. Shrewsbury, UK: Airlife Publishing Ltd, 2001. .

684
Cancelled military aircraft projects of the United Kingdom
1940s British bomber aircraft